British Library Or 4926 (1), known also as P. Lond. Copt. 522 (Crum), is a papyrus codex with a collection of early Christian Gnostic texts in Coptic (sub-Akhmimic dialect). The manuscript has survived in a fragmentary condition. The codex is dated to the 4th century. Erroneously it is known also as British Library Or 4920 (1).

Description 
The manuscript was written on papyrus in the form of a codex. The text was written in one column per page. 24 fragment of it were survived, most of them are illegible. The measurements of the biggest fragment are 2.5 by 3.5 inches. It was later identified as a manuscript of the Gospel of Thomas (tractate 5).

It was examined by Frederic G. Kenyon and Walter Ewing Crum in 1905. According to Crum the dialect is a mixture of Akhmimic and Sahidic forms. Bentley Layton examined it twice, in 1978 and 1980. Currently the manuscript is housed at the British Library (Or. 4926) in London.

See also 
 Coptic manuscripts
 Nag Hammadi Codex II
 Nag Hammadi Codex XIII

 Greek manuscripts
 Papyrus Oxyrhynchus 1
 Papyrus Oxyrhynchus 654
 Papyrus Oxyrhynchus 655

References

Further reading 
 Bentley Layton, Nag Hammadi codex II, 2-7: together with XIII, 2*, Brit. Lib. Or.4926(1), and P.OXY. 1, 654, 655 : with contributions by many scholars, BRILL, 1989.

External links 
 London, British Library Or 4926 (1)

Gnostic Gospels
4th-century manuscripts